Thor Egil Olsen (born 15 April 1957) is a Norwegian coxswain. He competed in the men's coxed pair event at the 1972 Summer Olympics.

References

1957 births
Living people
Norwegian male rowers
Olympic rowers of Norway
Rowers at the 1972 Summer Olympics
Sportspeople from Drammen
Coxswains (rowing)